Polsat Café is a Polish lifestyle television channel aimed primarily at women. It is owned and operated by Polsat.

Programmes 
Example of programmings aired on Polsat Café:
 Szpital dziecięcy
 Na zdrowie
 Zoom na miasto
 Zaskocz bliskich
 Shopping Queens: Królowe zakupów
 Botched Up Bodies
 Mała czarna
 Randki bez cenzury
 Odyseja życia
 Jak być młodym?
 Kobieta Cafe
 Looksus
 Zdrady
 Gwiazdy bez cenzury
 Grunt to rodzinka
 Baby Room
 Randka z nieznajomym
 Walka o piersi
 Café w formie
 W obiektywie Justyny Steczkowskiej
 Demakijaż
 WySPA
 Jem i chudnę
 Niebezpieczne kobiety
 Seks na weekend

History 
It launched on 2 August 2004. Polsat Zdrowie i Uroda Polsat Cafe on 5 October 2008 Zakończenie Programu on 6 October 2008 Rozpoczęcie Programu startu kanału 6 pażdziernika 2008   It was renamed as Polsat Café on 6 October 2008.

On April 6, 2020  On August 29, 2021 Polsat Café changed its logo and graphic design along with neighboring Polsat Cafe channels.

The logo was changed again, on August 30, 2021 with the major rebranding of Polsat Cafe, and it's television channels.

Logo

External links

References

Polsat
Television channels in Poland
Television channels and stations established in 2008